Platform is a 2000 Chinese film written and directed by Jia Zhangke. The film is set in and around the small city of Fenyang, Shanxi province, China (Jia's birthplace), from the end of the 1970s to the beginning of the 1990s. It follows a group of twenty-something performers as they face personal and societal changes. The dialogue is a mixture of local speech, mainly Jin Chinese and Mandarin. The film has been called "an epic of grassroots". It is named after a popular song about waiting at a railway platform.

Platform has garnered wide acclaim from critics in the years since its release, and is often named one of the greatest films of the 2000s.

Plot
The film starts in 1979 in the wake of the Cultural Revolution. A theatre troupe of young adults in Fenyang performs state-approved material. The troupe includes Cui Minliang and his friends, Yin Ruijuan, Zhang Jun, and Zhong Ping. Zhang and Zhong are together. Cui asks Yin if she is his girlfriend, but she replies that she is not. The troupe leaves their hometown and travels throughout the country for several years during the 1980s. Yin stays behind in Fenyang and becomes a tax collector. The authorities find out about the illegal sexual relationship between Zhang and Zhong, and Zhong then leaves the group, never to return. As China undergoes massive social changes, the troupe alters their performances and starts to play rock music. They eventually return to Fenyang. Cui, jaded by his years on the road, reunites with Yin.

Cast
 Wang Hongwei – Cui Minliang
 Zhao Tao – Yin Ruijuan
 Liang Jingdong – Zhang Jun
 Yang Tianyi – Zhong Ping
 Wang Bo – Yao Eryong
 Han Sanming – Sanming

Critical reception
Platform was voted the second best film of the past decade by the Toronto International Film Festival (TIFF)'s Cinematheque, by more than 60 film experts (historians, archivists, etc.) from around the world.  Another film by Jia Zhangke, Still Life, was voted the third best film.  Platform placed 32 on Slant Magazine's list of the 100 best films of the 2000s and was named as one of Sight & Sound's films of the 2000s. Platform was ranked the 11th best film of the decade in an international poll conducted by Film Comment. In 2016, film critics from the Austrian Film Museum, Der Standard and Le Monde included Platform in their top 10 films of the 21st century.

The film has a 79% rating on Rotten Tomatoes based on 19 reviews, with an average score of 6.72 out of 10. On Metacritic, the film has a score of 76 based on 7 critic reviews.

Awards
 Venice Film Festival, 2000
 Netpac Award
 Three Continents Festival, 2000
 Golden Montgolfiere
 Singapore International Film Festival, 2000
 SFC Young Cinema Award
 Buenos Aires International Festival of Independent Cinema, 2001
 Best Film
 Fribourg International Film Festival, 2001
 Don Quixote Award
 FIPRESCI Prize

References

External links
 
 
 
 
 Postsocialist Grit An essay on ideology and aesthetics in Platform and Unknown Pleasures at Offscreen Journal

2000 films
2000s coming-of-age drama films
Chinese coming-of-age drama films
Films directed by Jia Zhangke
Films set in Shanxi
2000 drama films
2000s Chinese films